Military ranks of Cape Verde are the insignia used to denote rank in the Cape Verdean Armed Forces, including the National Guard and Coast Guard.

Background 
The Cape Verdean Armed Forces have existed since independence from Portugal in 1975.  The currently comprise 1,200 personnel in the National Guard, plus 200 Coast Guard and 100 in the Air Force (which organisationally comes under the Coast Guard).  The structure and organisation is defined by the Decree-Law no. 30/2007 of August 20.  The National Guard and Coast Guard have their own headquarters which are responsible to the Chief of Staff of the Armed Forces, a colonel.  The Chief of Staff also has responsibility for the armed forces' Staff Command and Logistics Command.   The chief of staff is supported by a deputy, also a colonel.  The Coast Guard use the same rank structure as the land forces and have been commanded by an officer with the rank of major (2013) or lieutenant-colonel (2011).  

The organisation is headed by a General Chief of Staff who, in 2015, held the rank of Major-General.  The armed forces as a whole come under the control of the civilian government.

Officers
The rank insignia for commissioned officers for the national guard and coast guard.

Enlisted 
This table illustrates the rank insignia of enlisted members of the national guard and coast guard.

Former ranks
Officers

Enlisted

References 

Cape Verde
Military of Cape Verde